Guan Yingnan (born April 25, 1976) is a retired Chinese long jumper. She was born in Dalian.

International competitions

References

External links

1976 births
Living people
Athletes from Dalian
Chinese female long jumpers
Olympic athletes of China
Athletes (track and field) at the 2000 Summer Olympics
Athletes (track and field) at the 2004 Summer Olympics
Asian Games medalists in athletics (track and field)
Athletes (track and field) at the 1998 Asian Games
World Athletics Championships athletes for China
Universiade medalists in athletics (track and field)
Asian Games gold medalists for China
Medalists at the 1998 Asian Games
Universiade silver medalists for China
Medalists at the 2001 Summer Universiade
20th-century Chinese women